Hermann Baumann (born 23 January 1921) is a Swiss retired freestyle wrestler who won a bronze medal in the lightweight class at the 1948 Summer Olympics in London.

References

External links

 
 
 

1921 births
Possibly living people
Wrestlers at the 1948 Summer Olympics
Swiss male sport wrestlers
Olympic wrestlers of Switzerland
Olympic bronze medalists for Switzerland
Olympic medalists in wrestling
Medalists at the 1948 Summer Olympics